Hubert Smith (9 October 1891 – 7 June 1917) was an Australian cricketer. He played in three first-class matches for Queensland between 1911 and 1913. He was killed in action during World War I.

See also
 List of Queensland first-class cricketers

References

External links
 

1891 births
1917 deaths
Australian cricketers
Queensland cricketers
Cricketers from Queensland
Australian military personnel killed in World War I